Casadesus is the surname of a prominent French artistic family. Its members include:

  (1870–1954), composer and conductor
 Jules-Raphaël Casadesus, journalist, writer
  (1925–1999), writer, poet
 Robert-Guillaume Casadesus (1878–1940), composer and singer known as "Robert Casa"
 Robert Casadesus (1899–1972), pianist and composer
 Gaby Casadesus (1901–1999), pianist, wife of Robert Casadesus
 Jean Casadesus (1927–1972), pianist, son of Robert and Gaby Casadesus
 Henri Casadesus (1879–1947), violist and composer
 Catherine Casadesus (1902–1985), violinist
 Jacqueline Casadesus (1903–1976), pianist, singer and actress
 Christian Casadesus (1912-2014), actor, theatre manager
 Gisèle Casadesus (1914-2017), actress, daughter of Henri Casadesus
 Jean-Claude Casadesus (born 1935), conductor, son of Gisèle Casadesus
  (born 1962), lyric soprano, daughter of Jean-Claude Casadesus
  (born 1970), actor and model, son of Jean-Claude Casadesus
 Martine Pascal (born 1939), actress, daughter of Gisèle Casadesus
 Béatrice Casadesus (born 1942), painter and sculptor, daughter of Gisèle Casadesus
 Dominique Probst (born 1954), composer, son of Gisèle Casadesus
 Bernard Casadesus (1924–1994), singer, musicologist
 Marcel Casadesus (1882–1914), cellist
 Claude Casadesus (1913–1997), cellist
 Marius Casadesus (1892–1981), violinist and composer
 Mathilde Casadesus (1931–1965), actress
 Gréco Casadesus (born 1951), composer

See also 
Víctor Casadesús (born 1985), Spanish football player

References

External links 
 The Casadesus Family

French families